The simple-station CAD is part of the TransMilenio mass-transit system of Bogotá, Colombia, opened in the year 2000.

Location 
The station is located in western-downtown Bogotá, specifically on the Avenida NQS with entrances on Avenida de Las Américas and Calle 22B.

History 
This station opened in 2005 as part of the second line of phase two of TransMilenio construction, opening service to Avenida NQS. It serves the demand of the Clinca San Pedro Claver, the Centro Administrativo Distrital (District Administration Center), and the surrounding neighborhoods.

The station is named CAD due to its proximity to the District Administrative offices.

Station services

Old trunk services

Trunk services

Feeder routes 
This station does not have connections to feeder routes.

Inter-city service 
This station does not have inter-city service.

See also 
 Bogotá
 TransMilenio
 List of TransMilenio Stations

TransMilenio